Rupert Raj (born 1952) is a Canadian trans activist and a transgender man. His work since his own gender transition in 1971 has been recognized by several awards, as well as his inclusion in the National Portrait Collection of The ArQuives: Canada's LGBTQ2+ Archives.

Personal life
Raj was born in Ottawa, Ontario in 1952. His father was East Indian and his mother Polish; they met in Stockholm where Raj's father, Amal Chandra Ghosh, worked as a nuclear physicist. After the birth of their first child, the family moved to Ottawa, Canada, where Amal took up a position as a professor of physics at Carleton University. Both parents were killed in a car accident in August 1968, when Raj was sixteen, and the five children (three brothers and one sister) moved into four different homes until they respectively reached 18 or 21 years of age.

In 1971, at age 19, Raj scheduled an appointment with the Harry Benjamin Foundation's endocrinologist, Dr. Charles Ihlenfeld. Since Raj was not yet 21, the age of majority in New York, his older brother provided consent. Dr. Ihlenfeld examined Raj and administered his first shot of testosterone.

Raj graduated with a Bachelor of Arts in psychology from Carleton University in 1975, and moved to Vancouver, British Columbia, following two friends, both trans women activists who had been involved in the Association of Canadian Transsexuals (A.C.T.) in Toronto. Raj continued his activism by starting a petition to get Ontario to cover sex-reassignment surgery through the provincial health insurance plan, OHIP—an effort that was unsuccessful at the time.

In May 1977, Raj moved with his partner (a trans woman who was to become his wife in the late 1980s) and his two children to Calgary, Alberta, because they had learned that surgeons at the Foothills Hospital, in affiliation with the University of Calgary's gender clinic were performing phalloplasties for female-to-male (FTM) transsexuals. While they were both approved for phalloplasty, neither of them had the surgery at that time; at only 100 pounds, the surgeons concluded that Raj did not have enough tissue to work with. Raj did, however, undergo the panhysterectomy at this time. After waiting for another 34 years, he finally underwent "bottom surgery" (not phalloplasty, but metoidioplasty) in Montreal, Quebec in 2012 at age 60.

Foundation for the Advancement of Canadian Transsexuals and Gender Review

In January 1978, Raj started an organization for trans people (including trans men and women, as well as cross-dressers), the Foundation for the Advancement of Canadian Transsexuals (FACT); the organization's newsletter was Gender Review: A FACTual Journal. FACT continued some of the earlier work of the ACT. The first issue of Gender Review was published in June 1978 and included a story on “Transsexual Oppression” concerning Montrealer Inge Stephens; information about transsexual resources; a listing of publications by Dr. Harry Benjamin and Dr. Charles L. Ihlenfeld; a bibliography of books and articles by and about trans people; and news items about Mario Martino, trans woman Canary Conn's appearance on the Phil Donahue show, and other notices. Raj moved back to Ottawa and then to Toronto in the following years, but continued to edit the journal until February 1982.

In December 1981 Raj decided to focus on the unique, specific needs of trans men. At the time, there were very few trans advocacy groups for trans men in particular. Raj's work, based in Toronto, Canada, joined that of Mario and Becky Martino's Labyrinth Foundation's Counseling Services (Yonkers, NY); Johnny A's F2M (Tenafly, NJ; Jude Patton's Renaissance group in Santa Ana, CA; and Jeff S.’s group in Southern California. Raj resigned from his role at both FACT and Gender Review, and both were taken over by Susan Huxford, a trans woman from Hamilton, ON with whom Raj had begun working in late 1979.

Metamorphosis Medical Research Foundation and Metamorphosis Magazine

Raj had planned to partner with Mario Martino (also known as Angelo Tornabene) in Yonkers, NY to research, develop, and market a penile prosthetic device as an alternative to phalloplasty. It was for this reason that Raj named the new organization the Metamorphosis Medical Research Foundation (MMRF). At the same time, however, Raj wanted to provide support for other trans men, and serve as an information broker between the medical/psychological community and trans men and their loved ones. Beginning in 1979 and through the MMRF years, Raj was also an active correspondent with Lou Sullivan, and Raj’s friendship and activism played an important role in Sullivan’s later work in founding the San Francisco-based support and education group “FTM” in 1986.

Consequently, Raj founded the bi-monthly magazine Metamorphosis (February 1982  February 1988). The magazine promised information on various aspects of trans men written by Raj and others, clinical research, hormones, surgery, tips to effectively passing as male in public, and legal reform for trans people. Metamorphosis became the most important international magazine for FTMs in the 1980s. Most of its subscribers were American, but there were also trans men from Canada, Great Britain, Europe, Australia and New Zealand who eagerly paid to get the sought-after news, information and resources.

In 1988, Raj decided to close MMRF and end publication of Metamorphosis due to cumulative burnout.

Gender Worker and Gender NetWorker

Raj formed a new organization in June 1988, Gender Worker (later named "Gender Consultants" when his then wife joined his entrepreneurial enterprise as a co-consultant), and published a new newsletter Gender NetWorker specifically designed for “helping professionals and resource providers” who worked with transsexuals and transvestites (aka cross dressers) (1988, two issues).
Between 1990 and 1999, Raj was not publicly active as a trans activist, opting to mainstream into cisgender, straight society for those nine years in hopes of healing from massive burnout. Raj re-emerged in 1999 to begin a support group in Toronto called the Trans-Men/FTM Peer-Support Group. Since then, Raj has been active in Toronto as a psychotherapist, gender specialist, and trans-positive professional trainer.

RR Consulting and Beyond
In April 2002, Raj founded “RR Consulting,” a part-time, home-based, private psychotherapy and consulting practice serving trans, genderqueer, intersex and two-spirit adults and their loved ones, and also gender-independent kids and their parents. He also assessed trans people for readiness for either cross-sex hormone therapy or sex-reassignment surgery. Additionally, he provided trans-focussed training workshops on the medical, psychological, social, vocational, legal and spiritual/existential aspects of gender identity and gender transitioning for hospitals, health centres, universities, colleges and corporate workplaces.
In November 2002, Raj started working as a mental health counselor at Sherbourne Health Centre (SHC) in Toronto, providing individual, couple and family therapy for lesbian, gay, bisexual, transsexual, transgender, gender-questioning and sexually-questioning clients and their loved ones, and also co-facilitated SHC's “Gender Journeys” (a psychoeducational group for people considering transitioning to their identified gender) from 2006 to 2013. He retired from Sherbourne in 2015.

Beyond his clinical work, Raj was active in the trans, genderqueer, intersex and two-spirit communities in Toronto, participating in numerous community advisory committees for local community agencies, spearheading the first annual Trans Pride Day at SHC in 2004 (which was later renamed to include intersex and two-spirit people), delivering public speeches at the 2011 Honoured Dyke Group event of Pride Toronto (honouring the Trans Lobby Group, of which Raj was the sole trans male member), the 2012 Toronto Trans March, and the 2014 Transgender Day of Remembrance (TDoR) held at Toronto City Hall, proclaiming it as an official day in Toronto along with the raising of the first Ontario trans flag. On July 1, 2018, he marched in the Trans* Pride Toronto March, proudly carrying the Trans Coalition Project (Toronto) banner with Toronto Trans Alliance leader, Stephanie Woolley and Trans Lobby Group leader, Susan Gapka. On August 4, he led Fierté Simcoe Pride’s Trans* Rally/March in Orillia, Ontario, along with trans youth leader, Brandon Rhéal Amyot. Raj officially retired in 2017, and now lives in southern Europe.

"Voluntary Gender Work" and Burn-out 
Rupert Raj coined the term "voluntary gender worker" to describe the unofficial (and often unrecognized) labor that transgender activists (including himself) do. In a speech given at the 2016 Moving Trans History Forward Founders Panel, Raj described the work that he had done over the past thirty years, including (but not limited to) "providing information, referrals, education, counseling, [...] free education, doing training workshops, offering newsletter and magazine subscriptions on transsexualism, gender dysphoria, and gender reassignment to psychiatrists, psychologists, psychotherapists, social workers, physicians, and nurses, as well as researchers academics, educators, students, lawyers, policy makers, and politicians."  Raj works to bring attention to the risks that voluntary gender work brings to those who in a 1987 essay titled "Burnout: Unsung Heroes And Heroines In The Transgender World," originally published in The Transsexual Voice. Raj runs through an abbreviated list of activists he knows who are suffering burnout before turning to his own person experience. At the time of writing, he stated that "I am not yet ready to resign, even though I have been suffering symptoms of 'burn-out' for about a year now (and wish I could go on a sabbatical leave for a few month). Yet I/we desperately need resources in order that [we] might survive."  Almost thirty years later, Raj announced that he had taken indefinite medical leave as a result of said burn-out, and he officially retired from his job as a psychotherapist at Toronto's Sherbourne Health Centre .

Education and Professional Affiliations
In 2001, Raj graduated from The Adler School of Professional Psychology (main campus based  in Chicago) with a Master of Arts in Counseling Psychology. Raj is a member of the Canadian Professional Association for Transgender Health (CPATH) (2007 – present), and in 2015 became a Canadian Certified Counsellor (CCC) and joined the College of Registered Psychotherapists of Ontario (CRPO).

Publications and Presentations
To date, Raj has published four trans-focused clinical research papers. He has written a book chapter in the 1997 edited collection Gender Blending. Raj is also the co-editor (with Prof. Dan Irving of Carleton University) of Trans Activism in Canada: A Reader. The book includes chapters from a total of 43 transgender and cisgender contributors in British Columbia, Ontario and Quebec, and a foreword by Prof. Aaron Devor of the University of Victoria and an afterword by Prof. Viviane Namaste of Concordia University in Montreal, Quebec.

Since 1999, Raj has designed and delivered more than 20 distinct trans-focused training workshops and presentations in Canada, the US and the UK. In April 2006, he taught an accredited elective course for The Adler School of Professional Psychology (Ontario campus) in Toronto, employing his "TransPositive Therapeutic Model" (2002), supporting transsexual/transgender adults. Building on this basic model, Raj's "TransFormative Therapeutic Model" (2008) supported therapists working with couples and families with trans members, as well as gender non-conforming youth and their parents.

From 1982 to 1991, Rupert compiled/edited an international trans poetry anthology, Of Souls and Roles,  Of Sex and Gender (likely the first of its kind), which he donated in manuscript form to The ArQuives: Canada's LGBTQ2+ Archives in 2006. From 1991 to 2014, he added several more poems and modified the title: “Of Souls & Roles, Of Sex & Gender: A Treasury of Transsexual, Transgenderist & Transvestic Verse from 1967 to 1991." The volume includes nearly 400 poems penned by 169 trans people throughout Canada, the US, the UK, Ireland, Australia and New Zealand, and was donated to The Transgender Archives where it is currently available via PDF.

In 2017, an article Raj wrote, "Worlds in Collision", appeared in the anthology of writing about Toronto's queer history, Any Other Way: How Toronto Got Queer. His sociohistorical memoir, Dancing The Dialectic: True Tales of A Transgender Trailblazer was first published in 2017; a second edition  was published in 2020.

Recognition

Raj has received a number of awards, including a listing in the International Who’s Who In Sexology (First Edition, The Institute for Advanced  Studies in Human Sexuality in San Francisco, 1986) and two Lifetime Achievement Awards: the City of Toronto's Access, Equity, and Human Rights Pride Award (2001) and the Community One Foundation's Steinert and Ferreiro Award, a recognition of leadership in Canadian LGBTTIQQ2S communities (2010).

In 2011, The Trans Health Lobby Group (THLG) won an award from Pride Toronto as the “Honoured Dyke Group." The THLG was co-founded by Rupert Raj, Susan Gapka, Michelle Hogan, Joanne Nevermann and Darla S.; subsequent early members included Shadmith Manzo, Martine Stonehouse and Davina Hader. Raj was the only active trans-male member.

In 2013, Raj was honoured by The ArQuives: Canada's LGBTQ2+ Archives in Toronto, the largest community-based LGBTQ archive in the world, through his induction into The ArQuives' National Portrait Collection. Original Plumbing, a Brooklyn-based trans* male quarterly periodical, included Raj in its 2013 Heroes issue, along with other trans* historical figures and activists. Raj is featured in the 1999 video, "Rupert Remembers," in a 2000/2001 Canada-wide TV documentary series, "Skin Deep" , and in a 2001 video, "Rewriting the Script: A Love Letter to Our Families," reflecting the experiences of queer South Asians and their families . Also in 2013, the Trans Lobby Group, which Raj co-founded as the Trans Health Lobby Group, won an Inspire Award in Toronto for “Community Organization of the Year Award” (Note: The THLG changed its name by deleting “Health” to reflect a broader mandate beyond merely health care, including advocating for politico-legal human rights provincially and federally.) More recently, the Canadian Centre for Gender and Sexual Diversity has featured Rupert's work on their resources page for transgender, intersex, and Two Spirit people.

In 2022, Raj was selected to receive an honorary Doctor of Laws degree by Simon Fraser University, in Burnaby BC. SFU's honorary degree is the highest honour conferred by the university. The degrees are awarded to distinguished individuals in recognition of their scholarly, scientific or artistic achievement, or in recognition of exceptional contribution to the public good. In October 2022, Rupert was presented with Fantasia Fair's 2022 Transgender Pioneer Award. Established in 2002, this award is the transgender community’s longest existing award, honouring the lifetime achievements of those who have changed the world so trans people could come together in safety and comfort.

Notes
At this point, Raj was still using his earlier chosen name, Nicholas (or Nick) Christopher Ghosh. In later years, he started using the name "Rupert Raj" as a pseudonym, to separate his trans activism (under the name Rupert Raj) from his personal life (where he used the name Nick Ghosh). In 1988, he made "Rupert Raj" his legal name, using it in his activism and personal life, stopping the use of "Nick Ghosh."

References

External links
 Rupert Raj fonds at The ArQuives: Canada's LGBTQ2+ Archives

1952 births
Living people
Canadian people of Indian descent
Canadian people of Polish descent
Transgender rights activists
Transgender men
Canadian LGBT rights activists
Canadian transgender writers
Writers from Ottawa
Canadian psychologists